Under Dusken is the official student newspaper in Trondheim, Norway, with a circulation of 10,000 copies. 
Founded  in 1914, it is Scandinavia's oldest student newspaper, and the second largest student newspaper in Norway after Oslo's Universitas.

About 60 students work pro bono to produce a new edition of Under Dusken every second week.

The newspaper is jointly owned by Studentersamfundet i Trondhjem and Studentsamskipnaden i Trondheim through the media holding company Mediastud, which also is the publisher of Studentradioen i Trondheim (Norway's first student radio) and Student-TV (Scandinavia's oldest student television station).

The editor in chief is elected annually by the board of Mediastud. However, continuity has been ensured by electing candidates nominated by the editorial board of the newspaper.

Software development 
Under Dusken has since the mid 90s developed many of their own utilities. The computer department in Under Dusken has developed two content management systems, Aranea and Pegadi.

Pegadi 
Pegadi is written in Java and development was started in the beginning of 1999. The system works like a word processor with note field and gives the editors the ability to see how much has been written on each article.

Aranea 
Aranea is written in Java and uses technologies like JPA, Spring og Velocity. This is the CMS that serves the newspaper's website underdusken.no.

External links
 Official website.

Newspapers published in Norway
Newspapers established in 1910
Student newspapers
Mass media in Trondheim